Lisianthus is a common name for flowers in the genus Eustoma.

Lisianthus may also refer to:

 Lisianthus (character), a fictional character in the anime series Shuffle!

See also
Lasianthus (sometimes spelled Lisianthus), a plant genus